The Bicol Natural Park is a protected area of the Philippines located in the Bicol Region of southern Luzon. It straddles the mountainous border between the provinces of Camarines Norte and Camarines Sur in the northern interior of the Bicol Peninsula. First declared as a national park covering  on 13 February 1934 through Proclamation No. 657 of Governor General Frank Murphy, the Bicol National Park was later extended to its present area of  through amendments made in Proclamation No. 655 signed by President Manuel Luis Quezon on 23 December 1940. The area was reclassified as a natural park on 29 December 2000 by virtue of Proclamation No. 43 by President Joseph Estrada.

Geography

The Bicol Natural Park spreads across the Camarines Norte municipalities of Basud and Mercedes, and the Camarines Sur municipalities of Sipocot and Lupi.

The park is crossed by five rivers and eleven creeks which empty into the Bicol River. It contains natural swimming pools, picnic areas, park and camping areas, natural trails, back country shelters, and botanical and zoological gardens. A few settlements also exist within the park's boundary with a population total of 9,802 in 1991, the largest being Tuaca and San Pascual in Basud, Tible, Aldezar & Banban in Sipocot, and Sooc, San Jose & Napolidan in Lupi.

Biodiversity
The park covers more than thirty percent of the total lowland rainforest area remaining in the Philippines. The park is dominated by apitong trees, as well as yakal, white lauan, bagtikan, guijo, dalingdingan, hagakhak, narig, and red lauan. It also supports palm tree species such as kaong, Albert palm, bamboo palm and anahaw. Other flora found in the park are kamagong, molave, dita, magabuyo, malaikmo, almaciga, heart leaf, hauili, balobo, catmon, malugai and tibig.

The National Museum also documented the following wildlife species in 1991: the Philippine forest rat, Geoffroy's rousette, Malay civet, palm civet, Philippine dawn bat, Philippine long-tailed macaque, red junglefowl, king quail, brahminy kite, green imperial pigeon, eastern grass owl, black-naped oriole, snowy egret, South American cane toad, giant Visayan frog, Tokay gecko, and several species of snakes and lizards.

Threats
The Bicol Natural Park faces threats from illegal logging, firewood collection, charcoal production and human encroachment. In 1992, with the passage of the National Integrated Protected Areas System Act (NIPAS), a total of 738 families were evicted from the park and were transferred to resettlement sites in Labo and Camarines Sur. Their houses, located mostly along the highway, were demolished and their agricultural crops and farms abandoned. However, according to a 2009 report from the Department of International Development of the United Kingdom, illegal practices and settlement still exist and only  of the park's forest cover remains. In 2013, the Department of Environment and Natural Resources for the Bicol Region ordered the park's closure to human activities with a total log ban and anti-illegal logging task force set up as part of the government's National Greening Program. The program also aims to plant 1.5 billion trees from 2011 to 2016.

Accessibility
The park is easily accessible from the Pan-Philippine Highway (AH26) that runs through the middle of the park. Before Andaya Highway was opened in 2003, this was the main highway that connected Manila to Naga and Legazpi as well as the Visayas and Mindanao passing through Daet and other coastal Camarines Norte municipalities.

See also
 Luzon rainforest

References

Natural parks of the Philippines
Geography of Camarines Norte
Geography of Camarines Sur
Protected areas established in 1934
1934 establishments in the Philippines